Carlos Monín (18 July 1939 – 6 January 2023) was a Paraguayan football player and manager who played as a centre-back.

Playing career
Monín stood out on his school's football team in 1955 in two tournaments in Asunción and Buenos Aires. The following year, he was recruited by Cerro Porteño, based in Asunción, and became a starter in 1958. When he was 19, he made his debut for the national team, playing in four matches in the 1959 South American Championship in Ecuador. In 1960, he transferred to CR Flamengo in Brazil, where he played for one season. He then returned to Cerro Porteño, where he won the 1961 season championship and competed in the 1962 Copa Libertadores. He was again selected for the national team in 1962 for the FIFA World Cup qualification. His total number of national team selections is not certain, but is estimated at 18 appearances.

In 1962, Monín crossed the Atlantic to play for Toulouse FC in the French Division 1. After few appearances initially, he eventually rose to prominence as a defender. In 1967, the club merged with Red Star F.C. and moved to Saint-Ouen-sur-Seine. In 1969, he was responsible for breaking the leg of Olympique Lyonnais forward Fleury Di Nallo, which harmed his reputation. In 1973, Red Star was relegated to Division 2.

Managerial career
In 1978, Monín became manager of Red Star's reserve team, where he still played regularly. In 1979, he was hired as coach of CA Mantes, which played in Division 4. He remained there until 1984.

Death
Monín died on 6 January 2023, at the age of 83.

References

1939 births
2023 deaths
People from Concepción, Paraguay
Paraguayan footballers
Paraguay international footballers
Association football central defenders
Ligue 1 players
Ligue 2 players
Cerro Porteño players
Red Star F.C. players
CR Flamengo footballers
Paraguayan football managers
Red Star F.C. managers
Paraguayan expatriate footballers
Paraguayan expatriate football managers
Paraguayan expatriate sportspeople in Brazil
Expatriate footballers in Brazil
Paraguayan expatriate sportspeople in France
Expatriate footballers in France
Expatriate football managers in France